Joshua Karpeh (born January 30, 1993), known professionally as Cautious Clay, is an American singer, songwriter, and record producer.

Early life and education
Karpeh was born on January 30, 1993, in Cleveland, Ohio and attended Benedictine High School. He graduated with a degree in International Affairs from the George Washington University in 2015. Karpeh worked as a real estate agent in New York City for two years and in advertising for a year before pursuing music full-time.

Career
Karpeh learned music production at GW University by remixing beats for friends. His music style is influenced by hip-hop, organic and electronic sounds. He plays multiple instruments including the saxophone, flute, guitar, bass, keyboard and drums.
 
Known by his stage name Cautious Clay, Karpeh, on September 22, 2017 released "Cold War", the first single from his debut EP Blood Type, which was first released on February 21, 2018, and then re-released on April 13, 2018 with the additional single "Stolen Moments".
 
Karpeh's second EP Resonance, was first released on May 30, 2018 and then re-released on August 22, 2018 with the additional song "Crowned". His third EP Table of Context, was released on March 27, 2019.

Karpeh played at the 2019 Billy Reid Shindig in Florence, Alabama. He also featured on the soundtrack of 13 Reasons Why: Season 3 with the song "Swim Home". Swim Home is one of two collaborations with John Mayer, the other is "Carry Me Away", featured on Table of Context.

"Cold War" was sampled on the song "London Boy" for Taylor Swift's seventh studio album Lover (2019).

Discography

Studio albums 
 Deadpan Love (2021)

Extended play 
 Blood Type (2017 and 2018)
 Resonance (2018)
 Table of Context (2019)

Singles 
 "Cold War"
 "Joshua Tree"
 "Stolen Moments"
 "French Riviera"
 "Crowned"
 "Reasons"
 "Sidewinder"
 "Swim Home"
 "Erase"
 "Cheesin" (with Cautious Clay, Remi Wolf, Still Woozy, Sophie Meiers, Claud, Melanie Faye & HXNS)"
 "Agreeable"
 "Dying in the Subtlety"
 "Roots"
 "Karma & Friends"
 "25/8"

Songwriting credits

References

External links

Musicians from Cleveland
Living people
1993 births
Songwriters from Ohio
Record producers from Ohio
American multi-instrumentalists